Otis France Rolley (born Otis Rolley, III on August 5, 1974) is the former planning director of Baltimore, serving from July 2003 until 2007. He was a Democratic candidate for mayor of Baltimore in 2011.

Early Years and Education
Rolley was raised by his mother and stepfather, Andrea Catherine Rolley and Otis Rolley, Jr. He has six siblings. Rolley grew up in Jersey City, New Jersey. He attended Sacred Heart Catholic grammar school and Lincoln High School.

Rolley then attended Rutgers College. He made headlines there in 1995, after Rutgers University's then-president, Dr. Francis Lawrence, made a controversial statement about African Americans. Rolley, among others, was outraged by Dr. Lawrence's comments to a group of professors regarding the “disadvantaged genetic background of African Americans” and worked with a coalition to remove Lawrence from his post. Rolley served in the leadership of the United Students Coalition, leading media outreach and organizing protests and acts of civil disobedience. He was arrested in April 1995 for obstructing a highway during a protest near the president's mansion. He went to trial charged with three misdemeanor offenses. He was acquitted of two of the charges, but found guilty of disturbing the peace. 

In 1996, Rolley graduated with honors from Rutgers College with a B.A. in political science and Africana studies and went on to attend the Massachusetts Institute of Technology for graduate studies in city planning with a concentration in housing and community economic development. While in graduate school, he worked as an urban development technician for the Jersey City Department of Housing, Economic Development and Commerce.

Career

Empower Baltimore Management Corporation
Rolley moved to Baltimore in the summer of 1998 and served as a business development officer with Empower Baltimore Management Corporation.

Baltimore Housing
He was recruited from EBMC in the same year to work as an executive assistant to the deputy housing commissioner during the mayoral administration of Kurt L. Schmoke. In December 1999, Martin O'Malley was elected mayor, and in January 2000, he introduced Rolley to the Baltimore community-at-large when he appointed him as assistant commissioner of operations for Baltimore City's Department of Housing and Community Development (HCD). After one month, Housing Commissioner Patricia Payne promoted him to deputy housing commissioner. One year later, January 2001, Commissioner Paul T. Graziano, head of Baltimore City's singularly managed dual agencies, the Department of Housing and Community Development and the Housing Authority of Baltimore City, appointed Rolley to the position of first deputy commissioner for both HCD and HABC.

As first deputy commissioner, at the age of 25, Rolley managed eighty divisions, a $100 million operating budget, and was responsible for approximately 2,000 employees. Responsible for the HCD and HABC's administrative operations, Rolley provided oversight of housing programs, community and human service activities, grants administration, and strategic planning.

Baltimore City Department of Planning
In July 2003, Mayor Martin O’Malley once again tapped Rolley to assist his administration, and after unanimous confirmation by the Baltimore City Council, Rolley was sworn in as the City of Baltimore's seventh director of planning in July 2003. At 29, Rolley was the youngest director of a large city-planning department in America. Rolley was also responsible for preparing and updating plans showing the physical development of the city; developing and monitoring the city's $370+ million annual capital budget and six-year capital development program for consideration of the Board of Estimates; and developing and maintaining a Comprehensive Master Plan for the city. Under Rolley's leadership, Baltimore adopted its first Comprehensive Master Plan in 39 years. It was also the first Comprehensive Master Plan to be adopted by both the Planning Commission and the city council in the history of the city.

City Hall
In November 2006 Mayor O’Malley was elected governor of the State of Maryland, and the city council president, Sheila Dixon, became mayor. She asked Rolley to co-direct her Transition Team, and after a successful transition, she asked him to join her administration as her chief of staff.

Central Maryland Transportation Alliance
After successfully assisting Mayor Dixon in completing the final year of former Mayor O’Malley's term, and helping her to earn her own term as the 48th Mayor of Baltimore, Rolley joined the nonprofit sector to serve as the founding president and chief executive officer of the Central Maryland Transportation Alliance (CMTA). He successfully launched and established CMTA, an advocacy organization formed by a coalition of area business, civic, environmental and philanthropic leaders, dedicated to improving and expanding transit and transportation options for the people of Central Maryland. CMTA is the only sole purpose transportation organization in the Baltimore metropolitan region. Under Rolley's leadership CMTA successfully advocated for increased funding for transit projects; built coalition support for a new east/west light rail connector, the Red Line; and completed the region's first comprehensive Transit Oriented Development Plan. Though a young organization, CMTA was honored twice by the Maryland Daily Record for its work as an Innovator of the Year in 2008 and 2009.

Urban Policy Development Consulting
In 2010, Rolley joined Urban Policy Development (UPD). UPD Consulting is a Baltimore-based, minority-owned public sector management consulting firm. Rolley's major projects included: Researched the feasibility of an affordable housing trust fund in Columbia, Maryland; development of strategic plans for numerous large urban school districts in New Jersey, Nebraska, Maryland and Florida; and ongoing performance and change management training to senior nonprofit executives nationwide.  Rolley headed UPD Consulting's urban redevelopment and local government reform sectors until 2014.

City of Newark
In August 2014, Rolley joined the administration of Mayor Ras Baraka as the Chief of Staff and Assistant Director to the Deputy Mayor of Housing and Economic Development.  Later that month, Mayor Baraka appointed Rolley as the Interim President of Brick City Development Corporation.  Rolley was tasked with managing a forensic audit of the agency, reconstituting the board of directors and refocusing its traditional economic development activities to align with the non-traditional Community Wealth Building economic development agenda of Mayor Baraka.  In December 2014, Brick City Development Corporation (BCDC) was renamed the Newark Community Economic Development Corporation and Rolley was named as the permanent President and CEO. While at Newark CEDC Rolley managed a $1.5 Billion development pipeline, completed an economic development plan for each of Newark's wards, 107 new business opened, 600+ businesses were served, there were over 1200 business technical assistance interactions, and the business licensing process went from taking 1 year to only taking 31 days.

The Rockefeller Foundation
In 2016, Rolley was named the North America Director for 100 Resilient Cities, an initiative pioneered by the Rockefeller Foundation.  Directing a staff of 12 urbanists, Rolley led the US and Canadian resilience policy and planning efforts, strategic social investment and technical assistance to 29 cities, helping them to build their capacity to address the top environmental and socioeconomic challenges, shocks and stresses, that threatened their urban resilience. In 2018, Rolley was named one of the 100 Top Black Urbanists in America.

In 2019, Rolley became a Managing Director for Economic Resilience and Operations within the US Jobs and Economic Opportunity Initiative at The Rockefeller Foundation.

Civic Engagement
Rolley has served as chairman of the board for Community Building and Partnership, Inc. (CBP) in West Baltimore's Sandtown/Winchester community and Park Heights Renaissance in Northwest Baltimore. He has been a member on the boards of Charles Village Community Benefits District, the Municipal Employees Credit Union, the Pen Lucy Action Network, the Baltimore City Small Business Resource Center, the Charles Street Development Corp, Urban Land Institute–Baltimore, Middle Grade Partnership, Downtown Partnership, University of Maryland Baltimore County Public Policy External Advisory Board, Open Society Institute–Baltimore, Live Baltimore and KIPP Baltimore.. He was also appointed by Governor Ehrlich to serve as Baltimore City's representative on the State of Maryland's Critical Areas Commission, and appointed by Governor O’Malley to serve on the Maryland Stadium Authority. Currently, he is a member of New Jersey State Committee for the Regional Plan Association and The Resilient America Roundtable of The National Academies of Sciences Engineering & Medicine.

Mayoral Candidacy
On April 13, 2011, Otis Rolley officially became a Democratic candidate in Baltimore's 2011 mayoral race and the first candidate of any party to officially announce his candidacy. Rolley's campaign platform had five main aspects: job creation and economic growth, improving education, increasing neighborhood safety, neighborhood revitalization, and rebuilding government. One of Rolley's chief criticisms of current and former Baltimore administrations had been an economic development policy focused almost exclusively, and with limited success, on luring large-scale projects to the city's downtown area. Rolley lost the 2011 Democratic primary election with 12.6% percent of the vote, placing behind incumbent Mayor Stephanie Rawlings-Blake and state Sen. Catherine Pugh.

Family
Rolley resides with his family in Northwest Baltimore's Ellicott city neighborhood, where he has lived since 2019.

He is married to Charline and is the father of three children, Nia, Noah, and Grace.

Notes

 "Rutgers Protesters Plead Guilty," Pristin, Terry; The New York Times; N.Y.: Jul 28, 1995. pg. B.1
 "At Rutgers, a Generational Divide; Reactions to Racial Remark Echo Historical Split in Black Leadership," Russakoff, Dale; The Washington Post;D.C.: Feb 27, 1995. pg. A.01
 https://web.archive.org/web/20101212092500/http://www.bmorenews.com/business/otis-rolley-joins-urban-policy-development.shtml
 http://cmtalliance.org/index.php?option=com_content&task=view&id=15&Itemid=49
 http://www.baltimorecity.gov/Government/AgenciesDepartments/Planning/ComprehensiveMasterPlan/Overview.aspx

1974 births
Living people
MIT School of Architecture and Planning alumni
Rutgers University alumni
Princeton School of Public and International Affairs alumni